Botrydiaceae is a family of yellow-green algae comprising 13 species in three genera.  It is the only family in the order Botrydiales.

References

Heterokont families
Xanthophyceae